The Weil Tennis Academy Challenger is a professional tennis tournament played on outdoor hard courts. It is part of the ATP Challenger Tour. It has been held annually in Ojai, California, United States, since 2010.

Past finals

Singles

Doubles

External links
Lawn Tennis Association (LTA) official website
ITF search

ATP Challenger Tour
Sports in Ventura County, California
2010 in sports in California
2010 in tennis
Hard court tennis tournaments in the United States